Xavier Mortimer  (born June 20, 1980), is a French magician and variety performer.  A winner of multiple awards, he has appeared on Penn & Teller: Fool Us, America's Got Talent, Masters of Illusion, Plus Grand Cabaret du Monde, and The Next Great Magician on ITV.  Xavier lives in Las Vegas and performs his resident show at the Strat.

Early life
Xavier grew up in the city of Briançon, France.  He studied at the Music and Dance Conservatory of La Rochelle.  Xavier also attended the Desmond Jones Acting School in London and the Jacques Lecoq Acting School in Paris.  He first witnessed magic at a local restaurant where a magician was performing.  Xavier received a book from his father on magic and read it repeatedly to study.

In the 1990s Xavier sold flowers at the local market on Sunday mornings to afford purchasing his first magic prop, a flying handkerchief.  He became a member of the magic circle in France at the age of 15 and subscribed to clubs to see live theater and street performing art centers.  In his mid teens, Xavier took up juggling, acrobatics, and accordion.

Career
At the age of eighteen, Xavier teamed up with the acrobat Thibaud De Premorel to form an act called Les Fréres (The Brothers).  Together they performed at concerts and corporate events.  In September 2005, Xavier opened his one-man show in Paris called L’Ombre Orchestre (The Shadow Orchestra) at Theatre Le Temple in Paris.

He toured his show and performed at Crazy Horse in Paris, Just for Laughs in Montreal, and the Edinburgh Fringe Festival, where he was seen by Cirque du Soleil in 2009.  He was offered a role in Cirque's production of ‘Michael Jackson ONE’ in Las Vegas and performed in the show for 3 years.

During his 3 years with Cirque, Xavier,  spent his evenings developing new material.  He was approached by Producer Alex Goude and together they created his show ‘Magical Dream’ which opened at the Sin City Theater at Planet Hollywood casino on June 6, 2016.  The show moved from Planet Hollywood to Bally's in January 2019, where it occurs nightly.

Xavier expanded his performances to include online content in the later part of 2019.  He partnered with many celebrities such as Rick Lax, Jason Derulo, and Justin Flom to create collaborative online video projects.  Xavier’s online videos have been viewed over 2 billion times.

In 2020, he fooled the Duo Penn and Teller, and gathered more than 10M followers online in one year as well as over 4 Billion views.

In 2021, he opened a brand new and more grandiose show at The Strat Casino in Las Vegas, The Dream Maker.

In 2022, Xavier has the second most viewed short video of all times on YouTube with 576 million views on a single video.

Awards
2003 International CMI meeting in Italy 
2010 Mandrake d'or award
2018 2020 2021 Las Vegas Review Journal Best of Vegas awards: Gold Winner Best Magic Show 
2019 Las Vegas Review Journal Best of Vegas awards: Bronze Winner Best Magic Show 
2020 Penn and Teller: Fool Us: Fooler

References

External links

1980 births
Living people
French magicians
People from Briançon